Sergey Nikolayevich Ponomarev (born 6 December 1956) is a Russian football coach and a former player.

Club career
He played in the third-tier Soviet Second League and lower levels during the existence of the Soviet Union, and made his second-tier debut when the Soviet Union dissolved and the Russian football pyramid was created in 1992, in the Russian Football National League.

Ponomarev was the first foreign professional footballer to play in the Iranian Football League (Azadegan League) after the Iranian Revolution. In 1994, he was invited to Isfahan, Iran by his countrymen Yevgeny Liyadin who was coach of F.C. Zob Ahan at the time, where he played for one season.

Coaching career
He coached FC Ryazan in the third-tier Russian Professional Football League in 2001 and 2002.

External links 
IranLig
Tebyan
 

1956 births
Living people
Soviet footballers
Russian footballers
Association football defenders
Zob Ahan Esfahan F.C. players
Russian expatriate footballers
Expatriate footballers in Iran
Russian expatriates in Iran
Russian football managers
FC Spartak Ryazan players